Abel Woolrich (1947–2006) was a Mexican character actor.

Acting career
His career spanned over thirty years of Mexican cinema, including films such as Mujeres salvajes and El callejón de los milagros; in addition, he had small parts in a few Hollywood movies such as Solo, The Mask of Zorro, Apocalypto, Ravenous and My Family.

Apocalypto and death
Woolrich had one scene in Mel Gibson's 2006 Mayan language film Apocalypto, but he died before the movie was released; as a result the movie is dedicated "In Remembrance of Abel."

Selected filmography

National Mechanics (1972) - Motociclista
Apolinar (1972)
México, México, ra ra ra (1976)
Chin chin el Teporocho (1976)
Cuartelazo (1977) - Capitán
Flores de papel (1978)
Nuevo mundo (1978)
Adios David (1979)
Broken Flag (1979) - Enrique Olivares
Para usted jefa (1980) - El chupamirto
El infierno de todos tan temido (1981) - Alberto
El corazón de la noche (1984) - Hombre joven
Mujeres salvajes (1984) - Pablo a Camper
Toy Soldiers (1984) - Pedro
Memoriales perdidos (1985)
Los náufragos del Liguria (1985) - Marino Albizetti
Los piratas (1986) - Marino Albizetti
¿Cómo ves? (1986)
The Mosquito Coast (1986) - Mercenary
The Realm of Fortune (1986) - Padrino
Va de Nuez (1986)
Camino largo a Tijuana (1988) - Paco
Romero (1989) - Campesino
Old Gringo (1989) - Tall Soldier
Cabeza de Vaca (1991) - Shipwrecked Man
Pure Luck (1991) - Prisoner
Gertrudis (1992) - Margaito
The Harvest (1992) - Toothless Local
Dama de noche (1993) - Pescador poeta
The Beginning and the End (1993) - Afanador
Dollar Mambo (1993) - The Drunkard
La ultima batalla (1993) - Papa De Pablo
La orilla de la tierra (1994) - Fisico
Ámbar (1994) - Marinero Polaco I
Dos crímenes (1994) - Colorado
My Family (1995) - Oxcart Driver
El Callejón de los Milagros (1995) - Zacarías
Solo (1996) - Lazaro
Et hjørne af paradis (1997) - Fattig Sanger
Perdita Durango (1997) - Old Man in Cemetery
Me llaman Madrina (1997)
The Mask of Zorro (1998) - Ancient Zorro
Ravenous (1999) - Borracho
Before Night Falls (2000) - Hungry Inmate
De la calle (2001) - Félix
El gavilán de la sierra (2002) - Meliton Merez
Vampires: Los Muertos (2002) - Beggar
Don de Dios (2005) - El Loco
Apocalypto (2006) - Laughing man

References

External links

2006 deaths
Mexican male film actors
Year of birth unknown
1947 births